A fuddling cup is a three-dimensional puzzle in the form of a drinking vessel, made of three or more cups or jugs all linked together by holes and tubes. The challenge of the puzzle is to drink from the vessel in such a way that the beverage does not spill. To do this successfully, one must drink from the cups in a specific order. Fuddling cups were especially popular in 17th- and 18th-century England.

See also
Dribble glass
Puzzle jug
Pythagorean cup

References

External links

Mechanical puzzles
Drinkware